China Federation of Literary and Art Circles (CFLAC ), established in July 1949, is a Chinese people's organization composed of nationwide associations of writers and artists. CFLAC is one of the founders of CPPCC (Chinese People's Political Consultative Conference). CFLAC includes artist associations which are involved in such activities as academic studies and discussion, performances, exhibitions, and competitions.

Branches
China Artists Association
China Film Association
Chinese Musicians Association
China Television Artists Association
China Writers Association
China Theatre Association
China Calligraphers Association

Presidents of the Federation
Tie Ning 2016–present
Sun Jiazheng 2006–2016
Zhou Weizhi 1996–2006
Cao Yu 1988–1996
Zhou Yang 1979–1988
Guo Moruo 1960–1979
Vice-president: Mao Dun, Zhou Yang, Mei Lanfang, Ba Jin, Xia Yan, Cai Chusheng, Lao She, Xu Guangping
Guo Moruo 1953–1960
Vice-president: Mao Dun, Zhou Yang
Guo Moruo 1949–1953
Vice-president: Mao Dun, Zhou Yang

Officials
Party secretary: Zhao Shi 2011–present
Party secretary: Hu Zhenmin 2004–2010

Publishing
China Art Newspaper
Contemporary TV
Popular Cinema
Popular Photography

References

External links
Official Website

Arts organizations established in 1949
Chinese writers' organizations
Arts organizations based in China
1949 establishments in China
Organizations associated with the Chinese Communist Party